Paul Lee Kroll, also known as Lee Paul, (June 16, 1939 – September 22, 2019) was an American film and television actor. He was perhaps best known for playing as the bodyguard of "Doyle Lonnegan" (Robert Shaw) in the 1973 film The Sting, alongside actor Charles Dierkop who played the role of "Floyd". 

Paul was born in the United States, where he was raised in Brooklyn, New York. He attended at a college in Marietta, Ohio, in which he then served in the United States Air Force. Paul guest-starred in numerous television programs including Hawaii Five-O, Quincy, M.E., Wonder Woman, Fantasy Island, Tenspeed and Brown Shoe, The Rookies, The Fall Guy, Simon & Simon, Emergency!, Ironside, Police Woman, Matlock, Falcon Crest, Cannon, Happy Days, Mannix, Adam-12 and Mission: Impossible.

Paul was married to dancer Kathy Kroll. He was a emigrant to Sweden for Swedish-American Day. Paul worked as a petroleum engineer. He died in September 2019, at the age of 80.

Partial filmography 
Mission Impossible (1971-1972) - Gristin, Schmidt
Ben (1972) - Careu
The Sting (1973) - Lonnegan's bodyguard
The Rookies (1973) - Tim Duvall
Kung Fu (1973) - Gilchrist
Scream of the Wolf (1974) - Student
’’Get Christie Love’’ (1974) - Pilot Episode, Max Loomis
Happy Days (1974) - Mory
The Island at the Top of the World (1974) - Chief of Boat Archers
Police Woman (1975 - 1977)
Emergency! (1975) - Pete
The Fall Guy (1985) - Henchman
Deadly Friend (1986) - Sergeant Charlie Volchek
Survival Game (1987) - McClean
The Van Dyke Show (1988) - Al

References

External links 

Rotten Tomatoes profile

1939 births
2019 deaths
American male film actors
American male television actors
20th-century American male actors
American emigrants to Sweden
Petroleum engineers